Tatiana Valeryevna Barsuk (born 22 February 1985) is a Russian shooter. She represented her country at the 2016 Summer Olympics in the women's trap event, placing 18th of 21 shooters with 62 targets out of 75 hit.

References 

1985 births
Living people
Russian female sport shooters
Shooters at the 2016 Summer Olympics
Olympic shooters of Russia
Universiade medalists in shooting
Universiade silver medalists for Russia
European Games competitors for Russia
Shooters at the 2015 European Games
Medalists at the 2013 Summer Universiade
21st-century Russian women